Hilda Braid (3 March 1929 – 6 November 2007) was an English actress who had a long career on British television. She became well known in her later years for playing Victoria "Nana" Moon on the BBC One soap opera EastEnders.

Early life
Braid was born in Northfleet, Kent. She trained as an actress and dancer at the Royal Academy of Dramatic Art, having won a scholarship to train there. At RADA, she won the Lord Lurgan Award.

Career
After graduating from RADA, Braid did rep and was cast in West End theatre productions, including parts in The Waltz of the Toreadors from 1956 to 1957, and Pickwick from 1963 to 1964. Later, she was a member of the Royal Shakespeare Company, performing in productions of Richard II in 1974, and King John in 1974 to 1975. Braid made her television debut in the police drama No Hiding Place, playing Alice Flinders in an episode that aired on 14 October 1960. In 1963, she appeared in Suspense. In the 1960s and 1970s, she also appeared in Crossroads, Softly, Softly, Catweazle, Z-Cars, Play for Today, The Onedin Line, The Crezz, Emmerdale, and Man About the House.

Braid's first major role came in middle-age and was that of Florence Johnson in the late 1970s British sitcom Citizen Smith. Around this time, she also appeared in In Loving Memory, Robin's Nest, and On Giant's Shoulders. She later had recurring roles in other sitcoms, including L For Lester (1982), The Bright Side (1985), The 10 Percenters (1994–1996), and Gogglewatch (1997–1998). TV appearances during the 1980s and 1990s included Oliver Twist, Brookside, One Foot in the Grave, Goodnight Sweetheart, Dangerfield, The Bill, Midsomer Murders, ChuckleVision, My Family, and Casualty. She also briefly appeared alongside Al Murray in the sitcom Time Gentlemen Please in the early 2000s. Her film roles were few, but she appeared in the film version of For the Love of Ada (1972), the cult horror film Killer's Moon (1978), The Wildcats of St Trinian's (1980), and 101 Dalmatians (1996).

In 2002, Braid got the role that would make her best known: Nana Moon in EastEnders. Nana's grandson Alfie was played by Shane Richie, and following Ritchie's announcement that he was to leave the soap, her character was also written out, with the programme's makers saying it would be "unrealistic" for Nana to stay without Alfie. In Eastenders, her character Nana developed an aortic aneurysm, and before her death, wished to visit the grave of her husband (who had died during World War II) in France. The Normandy-set episode with Alfie and Nana won a British Soap Award for "Best Single Episode" in 2006. Braid left the soap, with Nana's death on 16 December 2005.

Later years
During her later years on EastEnders, Braid was having problems remembering her lines. Her departure from EastEnders proved to be the end of her acting career. She died on 6 November 2007 at the Royal Sussex County Hospital in Brighton, East Sussex. She had been diagnosed with Alzheimer's disease shortly after her departure from EastEnders, and subsequently moved into a nursing home in Hove. Braid was married to Brian Badcoe, an actor who died in 1992, and was survived by their son and daughter. Her funeral service took place on 25 November 2007 at Woodvale Crematorium in Brighton.

Filmography

Film

Television

References

External links

1929 births
2007 deaths
Alumni of RADA
English film actresses
English soap opera actresses
English stage actresses
English television actresses
Deaths from Alzheimer's disease
Deaths from dementia in England
People from Northfleet
Actresses from Kent